Peng Shou (born August 1960) is a Chinese engineer, business executive, and politician. He is the current chairman of the China Triumph International Engineering Co., Ltd (CTIEC) and party chief and president of its Bengbu Design & Research Institute for Glass Industry. He was a delegate to the 17th National Congress of the Communist Party of China and the 12th National People's Congress. He is a delegate to the 13th National People's Congress. He is vice-president of the  Chinese Ceramic Society (CCS) and the China Building Material Council (CBMF).

Biography
Peng was born in Tongcheng, Anhui, in August 1960. He received his bachelor of engineering degree and master's degree in management from Wuhan University of Technology in 1982 and 2001, respectively. After graduating in 1982, he was assigned to Bengbu Design & Research Institute for Glass Industry, where he was promoted to the head of its Shenzhen Branch in 1991 and to the president position in August 2000.

Honours and awards
 2010 Guanghua Science and Technology Award
 2015 Science and Technology Innovation Award of the Ho Leung Ho Lee Foundation 
 November 22, 2019 Member of the Chinese Academy of Engineering (CAE)

References

1960 births
Living people
People from Tongcheng, Anhui
Engineers from Anhui
Chinese chief executives
Wuhan University of Technology alumni
Delegates to the 12th National People's Congress
Delegates to the 13th National People's Congress
Members of the Chinese Academy of Engineering